The Hilliard Mixed Pairs national bridge championship was last held at the spring American Contract Bridge League (ACBL) North American Bridge Championship (NABC).

History

This was the original national mixed pairs event. It was contested at the summer NABC the first two years. It moved to the fall NABC in 1933 until it was replaced by the Rockwell Mixed Pairs in 1946. However, it continued to be contested at Bridge Week until 1957. It was contested at the newly created Spring NABC from 1958 to 1962
.

Winners

When this was the premier event for mixed pairs, before 1946, no pair defended its title successfully, or even won the trophy twice. Only a few players won it twice. Two pairs did win the Hilliard trophy more than once after it was downgraded in status: Kay and James Dunn, three times, Helen and Morris Portugal twice, all during the five-year span 1951 to 1955. Mary Jane and Arnold Kauder won in 1949 and finished second in 1950 and 1957. Married couples did not generally dominate the event, however.

All listings are "ladies first".

See also
 Rockwell Mixed Pairs, successor as premier event

Sources
 
 "Search Results: Mixed Pairs (Hilliard)". 1931 to 1962. ACBL. Visit "NABC Winners"; select a Discontinued NABC. Retrieved 2014-06-04. 

North American Bridge Championships
Contract bridge mixed pairs